Sean Bowen (born 5 September 1997) is a Welsh jockey who competes in National Hunt racing. Bowen is the son of horse racing trainer Peter Bowen.

Career
Bowen was an accomplished point-to-point jockey, who won the Wilkinson Sword title for his achievements in the discipline, later it was also won by his brother James Bowen. In 2015, Bowen won both the Champion Conditional Jockey Championship and the Racing Excellence Hands and Heels Championship. In the same year, Bowen won his first two Lester Awards for both Racing Excellence Conditional Jockey and the AtTheRaces Jump Ride of the Year for his win on Just A Par at Sandown Park.

In 2019, Bowen won his first Grade 1 race with victory onboard If The Cap Fits in the Liverpool Hurdle. His second Group 1 win would come in 2021 at Sandown with Metier winning the Tolworth Novices' Hurdle.

Previously, Bowen has been an official ambassador to Ffos Las Racecourse. He regularly rides for his father, David, Martin Keighley and Olly Murphy .

Major wins 
 Great Britain
 Liverpool Hurdle - If The Cap Fits (2019)
 Tolworth Novices' Hurdle -  Metier (2021)

References

External links
Sean Bowen profile at the British Horse Racing Authority

1997 births
Living people
Welsh jockeys
Lester Award winners